Korzus is a Brazilian thrash metal band formed in São Paulo in 1983. They are one of the first bands of the Brazilian thrash metal scene, along with bands like Sarcófago and Sepultura. Their first release was issued in the seminal metal compilation called SP Metal on Baratos Afins label in 1985.

They changed the lineup a lot of times since the birth of the band, but three members, Marcello Pompeu (on vocals), Silvio Golfetti (on guitars) and Dick (on bass guitar) remained. The classic lineup of the band (1988–1992) was Marcello Pompeu (vocals), Silvio Golfetti (guitars), Marcelo Nicastro (guitars), Dick (bass) and Roberto Betão Sileci (drums, replacing Zema who committed suicide in 1987).

History

Early days

Lacking the funds to record a studio album, their debut album, which was released in 1986 consisted of a collection of live recordings. A year later they released their first studio album called Sonho Maníaco.

Around that time, Silvio Golfetti played guitars for the L.A. speed metal band Agent Steel for a short time in 1987, because he was a friend of John Cyriis, vocalist of Agent Steel and born in Brazil. He temporarily played guitars for Sepultura at the time when Andreas Kisser was unable to play due to an arm injury.

In 1989, they changed their sound a little, going more in a direction of Bay Area thrash, and released the EP Pay For Your Lies, featuring a cover of Black Sabbath's "Under the Sun/Every Day Comes and Goes". During that period Korzus became a major metal band in Brazil; they even struck a friendship with their idol, Formula One racer Ayrton Senna.

1990s
In 1991, Korzus released their breakthrough album Mass Illusion. With production of Roger Moreira (vocalist/founder of the Brazilian rock band Ultraje A Rigor) the band gained more attention outside Brazil. A videoclip for the song "Agony" was made, and it received heavy air play on Furia Metal (a Brazilian version of MTV's Headbangers Ball).

Drummer Beto Silesci and the guitarist Marcello Nicastro left the band, as each one pursued their own projects (Beto Silesci formed a band with his wife and tried the drums in the hardcore band Ratos de Porão; Marcello Nicastro became a well-known player of cavaquinho – a short four-string guitar used to play samba).

After the departure of Beto Sileci and Marcello Nicastro, the band started to try an audience out of Brazil, due to the success of Sepultura.

They recruited a guitarist called Soldado and a drummer called Fernando Schaefer and recorded in 1994 the album KZS. The band was musically fitting with the 90s New York hardcore sound of bands such as Madball and Sick of It All. On tour they played in the States with Biohazard and S.O.D.

After two years, Soldado and Fernando Schaefer left the band (Fernando Schaefer became a drummer for several Brazilian bands like Treta, Pavilhão9, Rodox, Kiko Loureiro,  and recently Endrah), and to replace them, they hired Heros Trench for the guitar post and Rodrigo Oliveira as the drummer.

This lineup recorded a live CD at the Brazilian edition of the Monsters of Rock festival in 1998 and in 2004 they released the album Ties Of Blood.

Present
Korzus has a new formation, which includes Antônio Araújo as the new guitar player (replacing Silvio Golfetti). In 2010 the band released a new album, entitled Discipline of Hate by German label AFM Records.

Discography 
 Korzus Live (1985)
 Sonho Maníaco (1987)
 Pay For Your Lies (1989)
 Mass Illusion (1991)
 KZS (1994)
 Live At Monsters Of Rock (1998)
 Ties Of Blood (2004)
 Discipline of Hate (2010)
 Legion (2014)

References 

Brazilian thrash metal musical groups
Musical groups established in 1983
Musical groups from São Paulo
Musical quintets
1983 establishments in Brazil